Buripota Union is a union parishad of Meherpur Sadar Upazila,  in Meherpur District, Khulna Division of Bangladesh. There are 17 villages and 22 mouzas in the union.

References

External links
 

Unions of Meherpur Sadar Upazila
Unions of Meherpur District
Unions of Khulna Division